Mamello Makhabane (born 24 February 1988) is a South African soccer player who plays as a midfielder for JVW FC and the South Africa women's national team.

Playing career
Makhabane was included into the national team in 2005. After helping South Africa qualify for the 2012 Summer Olympics, Makhabane was unable to participate in the tournament due to a groin injury sustained in September 2011. In September 2014, she was named to the senior team roster in preparation for the 2014 African Women's Championship in Namibia.

She made her 100th appearance for South Africa in August 2019.

References

External links
 South Africa player profile

Living people
1988 births
People from Matjhabeng Local Municipality
Women's association football midfielders
Footballers at the 2016 Summer Olympics
South African women's soccer players
South Africa women's international soccer players
Olympic soccer players of South Africa
2019 FIFA Women's World Cup players
FIFA Century Club
Soccer players from the Free State (province)